Each winner of the 1991 Governor General's Awards for Literary Merit received $10,000 and a medal from the Governor General of Canada. The winners were selected by a panel of judges administered by the Canada Council for the Arts.

English

French

References 

Governor General's Awards
Governor General's Awards
Governor General's Awards